Dendropsophus nanus (common name: dwarf treefrog) is a species of frog in the family Hylidae.

It is found in northern Argentina, Paraguay, Uruguay, eastern Bolivia, Brazil, French Guiana, and Suriname. It is very common frog occurring in many habitat types and adapting well to anthropogenic disturbance. It inhabits herbaceous vegetation at the edge of standing water. Breeding takes place in temporary waterbodies.

The diet of Argentinean Dendropsophus nanus was found to consist mostly of dipterans and spiders. During the cold periods, these frogs partly rely on their fat reserves, more so than sympatric Hypsiboas pulchellus.

References

nanus
Amphibians of Argentina
Amphibians of Bolivia
Amphibians of Brazil
Amphibians of French Guiana
Amphibians of Paraguay
Amphibians of Suriname
Amphibians of Uruguay
Amphibians described in 1889
Taxa named by George Albert Boulenger
Taxonomy articles created by Polbot